Rawle Benjamin (born 8 January 1932) is a Guyanese cricketer. He played in one first-class match for British Guiana in 1953/54.

See also
 List of Guyanese representative cricketers

References

External links
 

1932 births
Living people
Guyanese cricketers
Guyana cricketers